Michael Marcantel is a former animation director on The Simpsons. He graduated from the California Institute of the Arts, where he studied in the Experimental Animation program under Jules Engel.

Simpsons episodes
He has directed the following episodes:

Season Eleven
"Bart to the Future"

Season Twelve
"Day of the Jackanapes"

Season Thirteen
"Weekend at Burnsie's"

Season Fourteen
"A Star Is Born Again"

Season Sixteen
"Thank God It's Doomsday"

Season Seventeen
"Bart Has Two Mommies"

Season Eighteen
"The Mook, the Chef, the Wife and Her Homer"

External links
 

Living people
American animators
California Institute of the Arts alumni
American animated film directors
American television directors
Year of birth missing (living people)